Gayle Patrick Hopkins (November 7, 1941 – March 20, 2016) was an American long jumper who competed in the 1964 Summer Olympics. He was born in Tulsa, Oklahoma.

References

1941 births
2016 deaths
American male long jumpers
Olympic track and field athletes of the United States
Athletes (track and field) at the 1964 Summer Olympics